McCullers is a surname. Notable people with the surname include:

Carson McCullers (1917–1967), American writer
Lance McCullers (born 1964), American baseball player
Lance McCullers Jr. (born 1993), American baseball player
Michael McCullers (born 1971), American screenwriter

See also
McCullers Crossroads, North Carolina, unincorporated community in the United States